The 2011-12 Azerbaijan First Division  is the second-level of football in Azerbaijan. Fourteen teams participated in Azerbaijani First Division in 2011-12.

Teams
At the end of the 2010–11 season, champions FC Absheron and runners-up was initially must be promoted but due financial difficulties, FC Absheron became defunct, while FK Mughan was demoted to first division and replaced by Sumgayit City F.C. A further three places were given to Taraggi FC, Lokomotiv-Bilajary FK and Həkəri FK, who will be debutantes from this season. In November 2011, Həkəri FK' owners announced that club will be dissolved and all of their results in Azerbaijan First Division will be annulled.  
On 10 April 2012, FK Qaradağ sealed promotion to league after winning first division. However, due decision of Association of Football Federations of Azerbaijan about licensing, no clubs from division will be promoted which means all clubs from last season will be remaining in the league.

League table

Results

References

External links
 pfl.az
  AFFA

Azerbaijan First Division seasons
Azer
2